Korotkov (masculine) or Korotkova (feminine) is a Russian surname. Notable people with the surname include:

 Andrey Korotkov (1954–2012), first Deputy Communications and Information Minister in Russia
 Aleksandr Korotkov (1909-1961), Soviet spy
 Egor Korotkov (born 1986), Russian freestyle skier
 Ilya Korotkov (born 1983), Russian javelin thrower
 Konstantin Korotkov, Russian scientist who developed technology for a form of Kirlian photography known as Gas Discharge Visualization (GDV) 
 Leonid Korotkov (born 1965), governor of Amur Oblast in Siberia, Russia
 Maria Zemskova-Korotkova, Russian rowing coxswain
 Nikolai Korotkov (1874–1920), Russian surgeon
 Nikolai Korotkov (footballer) (1893–1954), Russian football player
 Olesya Korotkova (born 1983), Russian female discus thrower
 Kira Muratova (née Korotkova) (1934-2018), Soviet and Ukrainian film director

Russian-language surnames